Brotherly Love is a 1928 part-silent, part-talkie comedy film produced and distributed by MGM and directed by Charles Reisner. It is a starring vehicle for the comedy team of Karl Dane and George K. Arthur. Young Jean Arthur supports the comedy duo. While essentially a silent film, the movie had music with sound effects and talking sequences.

Some publicity photos from the film show Dane with Buster Keaton, but it is not clear whether Keaton had a cameo in the film that was later cut or merely posed for a gag photo while visiting the set.

One copy, with sound discs, is in the collection of the UCLA Film & Television Archive.  The Library of Congress database lists no copies.

Cast
Karl Dane - Oscar
George K. Arthur - Jerry
Jean Arthur - Mary
Richard Carlyle - Warden Brown
Edward Connelly - Coggswell
Marcia Harris - Mrs. Coggswell

References

External links
Brotherly Love @ IMDb.com

1928 films
American silent feature films
Films directed by Charles Reisner
Metro-Goldwyn-Mayer films
1928 comedy films
Silent American comedy films
American black-and-white films
1920s American films